Axinidris hylekoites is a species of ant in the genus Axinidris. Described by Shattuck in 1991, the species is endemic to Ghana, where it was only observed in a rotten tree branch.

References

Endemic fauna of Ghana
Axinidris
Hymenoptera of Africa
Insects described in 1991